Marathwada is a proposed state and geographical region of the Indian state of Maharashtra. It was formed during the Nizam's rule and was part of the then Hyderabad State. The region coincides with the Aurangabad division of Maharashtra. It borders the states of Karnataka and Telangana, and it lies to the west of the Vidarbha and east of Uttar Maharashtra regions of Maharashtra. The largest city of Marathwada is Aurangabad. Its people speak Marathi and Urdu.

Etymology
The term Marathwada means the house of Marathi speaking people, that is land occupied by the Marathi-speaking population of the former Hyderabad state during the period of Nizam's rule. The term can be traced to 18th century state records of the Nizam of Hyderabad.

Demography
Marathwada has total area of 64590 km2 and had a population of 18,731,872 at the 2011 census of India.

At the time of the 2011 census, the territory making up Marathwada had a variety of languages. 77.98% of the population spoke Marathi, 9.56% Urdu, 6.49% Hindi and 3.20% Lambadi as their first language.

Under Nizams rule
The region of Hingoli and Aurangabad were a major hub for the military stations and depot during the time of Nizam as well as during the British rule. Also Hyderabad State took special work to build Dams, modify and renovate the existing underwater system, particularly in Aurangabad. Major works were undertaken to built railways (Nizam's Guaranteed State Railway) connecting the city of Hyderabad to Bombay (now Mumbai) via Aurangabad. Handlooms and paper factories were established in Kaghzipura near Aurangabad. Religious sites were developed in Khuldabad. 

Temporary guest houses were built for Sikh devotees in Nanded which lies in ruins due to neglect by the government authorities. Also roads connecting to Ahmedabad were initiated.

Cities and districts

Major cities of Marathwada region
All the cities below have population of more than 100,000 with Aurangabad having 1.1 million inhabitants per the 2011 census.
Aurangabad
Nanded
Latur
Parbhani
Jalna
Beed
Osmanabad

Districts
Aurangabad
Beed
Hingoli
Jalna
Latur
Nanded
Osmanabad
Parbhani

There are Municipal Corporations at Aurangabad Municipal Corporation, Nanded-Waghala Municipal Corporation, Latur Municipal Corporation, and Parbhani Municipal Corporation.

Tourism

The state government recognises Aurangabad as the "Tourism Capital of Maharashtra".  There are various tourist attractions in Aurangabad. Other places visited by tourists are:

Education

Marathwada has four government medical colleges, situated at Aurangabad, Latur, Nanded and Ambajogai.
The region also has good government engineering colleges such as SGGS Nanded, Aurangabad Government Engineering College.
It also has three major universities, being Dr. Babasaheb Ambedkar Marathwada University at Aurangabad, Vasantrao Naik Marathwada Agricultural University at Parbhani, and Swami Ramanand Teerth Marathwada University at Nanded.

The foundation of agricultural research in Marathwada region of Hyderabad state was laid by the by the 7th Nizam of Hyderabad Mir Osman Ali Khan with the commencement of the Main Experimental Farm in 1918 in Parbhani. During the Nizam's rule agricultural education was available only at Hyderabad; crop research centers for sorghum, cotton and fruits existed in Parbhani. After independence, this facility was developed further by the Indian government which was renamed as Marathwada Agriculture University on 18 May 1972. The Institute of Chemical Technology, Mumbai (formerly known as UDCT) has a satellite campus located in Jalna which was established in 2018.

Droughts and suicide of farmers
Marathwada is affected by frequent anomalies in rainfall during Monsoon season, which accounts for almost 80 percent of the annual rainfall. The average annual rainfall over the division is 882 mm. Almost three-fourths of the Marathwada division is covered by farmlands. Hence, drought continues to have a considerable impact on the life of farmers.

In some Marathwada districts recurring droughts have forced people to drink fluoride-contaminated groundwater from borewells which has inflicted debilitating fluorosis on many. 

The region also sees high instances of farmer suicides. According to government records, 422 farmers in Marathwada committed suicide in 2014. This was because of their inability to bear crop losses and a financial quandary made acute by water scarcity and an agrarian crisis. 2014 was the third consecutive year of low rainfall, and when rainfall did occur it was sometimes untimely and damaged crops. Of the 422 suicides, 252 cases were due to an inability to repay agricultural loans. There have been more than 117 farmer suicides in the first two months of 2017. According to a study by IIT Bombay, the severe or extreme droughts have frequently occurred in major portions of Marathwada, in the last few decades.

See also
 List of people from Marathwada
 Hyderabad State
 Nizam's Guaranteed State Railway
 Make in Maharashtra
 Manav Vikas Mission

References
Notes

Citations

Further reading
Beyond Economic Development: A Case Study of Marathwada
Vidarbha and Marathwada: Trapped in a vicious cycle -Hindustan Times
Cane cultivation leaving Marathwada bone dry: Study -The Times of India
Photo-essay on the 2016 drought in Marathwada
Have India's farm suicides really declined?  -BBC article
In worst drought year, Marathwada emerges new suicide region -Indian Express
‘Wrong method used to calculate Vidarbha, Marathwada backlog’  - The Times of India

 Human Development Report 2002 - Maharashtra (India)

 
Regions of Maharashtra